Marco Antonio Farfan (born November 12, 1998) is an American professional soccer player who plays as a left-back for Major League Soccer club FC Dallas. In 2017, he was named in the USL 20 Under 20, highlighting the league's 20 best players under 20 years old.

Career
Farfan joined Portland Timbers academy in 2013 and later signed with the club's United Soccer League affiliate Portland Timbers 2 (T2) at the beginning of their 2016 season.

After one season in USL and while still in high school, Farfan moved to the Portland Timbers first team for the 2017 season. On March 12, 2017, he became the first true homegrown and youngest ever player (at age 18 years, 120 days) to start a game for the Portland Timbers. That season he played in six MLS games (five starts) and started one U.S. Open Cup game and earned an MLS Team of the Week honor in April. In 2018, he was loaned to T2, an arrangement that allows him to play for both that team and the first team.

On December 13, 2020, Farfan was traded to Los Angeles FC in exchange for $300,000 in general allocation money.

On February 10, 2022, Farfan was traded to FC Dallas in exchange for Dallas defender Ryan Hollingshead.

Personal life
Farfan was born in Portland, Oregon, and is of Mexican descent. His brother Roberto Farfan played soccer for Oregon State University and the Timbers U23 team.

Career statistics

Club

Honors
Portland Timbers
MLS is Back Tournament: 2020

References

External links
T2 bio

1998 births
Living people
American soccer players
United States men's youth international soccer players
American people of Mexican descent
Homegrown Players (MLS)
Portland Timbers 2 players
Portland Timbers players
Los Angeles FC players
FC Dallas players
Association football defenders
Soccer players from Portland, Oregon
USL Championship players
Major League Soccer players
United States men's under-23 international soccer players